Park Byeong-seug (born 25 January 1952) is a South Korean politician and former broadcaster. He has been the Member of the National Assembly for Daejon West 1st constituency since 2000. He used to be the Deputy Speaker of the National Assembly (2012–2014) and the Deputy Mayor for Political Affairs of Seoul (1999–2000).

Early life and education 
Park Byeong-seug was born in Daejeon, South Chungcheong (now separated from the province) in 1952. He graduated from Sungkyunkwan University with a Bachelor in Law. He also obtained a doctorate in mass communication at Hanyang University.

Career 
He joined JoongAng Ilbo in 1985, where he used to be a correspondent in Hong Kong, the Head of Department of Industry, the Head of Department of Economy and the Director of Editorial Department. During the Tiananmen Square protests in 1989, he reported the detention of the General Secretary of the Communist Party Zhao Ziyang.

Prior to the 1997 presidential election, Park joined the National Congress for New Politics (NCNP) instead of the Alliance of Liberal Democrats (ALDE) despite of the strong support of the ALDE in his region. He was appointed the top spokesperson of the NCNP in 1998. In 1999, he was appointed the Deputy Mayor for Political Affairs of Seoul by the then Mayor Goh Kun, following the resignation of Shin Kye-ryoon in order to run for the upcoming general election. He resigned in 2000 to run for the general election in April.

Park has been the Member of the National Assembly for Daejeon West 1st constituency since 2000. On 4 June 2012, following the 2012 election, he contested the DUP preselection for the Deputy Speaker of the National Assembly and defeated Lee Seok-hyun with a margin 86–41. He was elected to the position on 2 July.

Following the 2016 election, Park contested to be the Speaker but came behind to Chung Sye-kyun and Moon Hee-sang. In 2018, he unsuccessfully ran again for the position, defeated by Moon Hee-sang with a margin 67–47. After the outright victory of the Democratic Party in 2020 election, he automatically became the sole 6-term MP, in which he was widely expected to be the Speaker without any preselections. On 25 May, he was confirmed as the Speaker by the Democratic Party. On 5 June, he was officially inaugurated as the new Speaker.

Personal life 
Park married to Han Myung-hui and has 2 sons. He is able to communicate in Standard Chinese.

Election results

General elections

Notes

References

External links 
 Official website
 Park Byeong-seug on Facebook
 Park Byeong-seug on Blog

1952 births
Living people
Deputy Speakers of the National Assembly (South Korea)
Minjoo Party of Korea politicians
Sungkyunkwan University alumni
Hanyang University alumni
People from Daejeon
Speakers of the National Assembly (South Korea)
Byeong